Jouko Suomalainen (born 8 April 1949) is a Finnish footballer. He played in 48 matches for the Finland national football team from 1970 to 1978. In club level he played for Kuopion Palloseura, Kuopion Pallotoverit and Kuopion Elo.

References

External links
 

1949 births
Living people
Finnish footballers
Finland international footballers
Association footballers not categorized by position
People from Kuopio
Kuopion Palloseura players
Koparit players
Sportspeople from North Savo